Michael Angelo Joseph (born 29 September 1971) is a Belizean sprinter. He competed in the men's 400 metres at the 1992 Summer Olympics.

References

External links
 

1971 births
Living people
Athletes (track and field) at the 1992 Summer Olympics
Belizean male sprinters
Olympic athletes of Belize
Commonwealth Games competitors for Belize
Athletes (track and field) at the 1991 Pan American Games
Athletes (track and field) at the 1994 Commonwealth Games
Place of birth missing (living people)
Pan American Games competitors for Belize